WA Premier Cricket in Western Australia refers to the semi-professional cricket league played at a level below the first-class Western Warriors and other state teams.  The competition is administered by the Western Australian Cricket Association. It is the premier club cricket competition in Western Australia and players vying for Western Warriors and national team selection are typically chosen from Premier Cricket competition clubs. Retiring international and first-class players wishing to continue playing will generally return to their original Premier Cricket club. There are currently 16 teams in the competition.

History
1st Grade clubs compete for the 'Alcohol.Think Again District Cricket Competition Shield'.

The First Grade minor premiers win the 'Kevin Sullivan Silver Cup' as well as a cash prize of $3000.

The 2014-15 First Grade premiers were Joondalup who defeated Gosnells in the Grand Final at the WACA Ground. Joondalup were also minor premiers and won the One Day League title. Claremont-Nedlands won the T20 title. The 2015-16 First Grade premiers were Rockingham-Mandurah, defeating Fremantle by 6 wickets at the WACA Ground. In the same year, Claremont-Nedlands won the One Day League title defeating Rockingham-Mandurah. The 2016-17 Grand Final was won by Subiaco-Floreat defeating Joondalup in an upset win. That year Claremont-Nedlands won the One-Day League for the second consecutive season. The 2017-18 season was filled with plenty of upsets including University defeating South Perth in the semi final before losing the Grand Final a week later against Claremont-Nedlands by 6 wickets at the WACA Ground.

Clubs

Current clubs

Notes
 Bayswater-Morley was known as the Bassendean Cricket Club between 1932–33 and 1947–48, the Bassendean Turf Cricket Club from 1947–48 to 1960–61 and the Bassendean-Bayswater Cricket Club from 1960–61 to 1980–81.
 Claremont-Nedlands was formed in 1989 from a merger of the Claremont-Cottesloe and Nedlands Cricket Clubs. The Claremont-Cottesloe Cricket Club, founded in 1898, was known as the Claremont Cricket Club between 1906 and 1948. The Nedlands Cricket Club was founded in 1928.
 Fremantle Cricket Club first competed in the competition in the 1887–88 season. The club withdrew from the competition several times to participate in local competitions, but fielded a team in the WACA competition from 1887–88 to 1888–89, 1890–91 to 1893–94, 1906–07 to 1908–09, 1910–11 to 1913–14, and from 1921–22 onwards. The club combined with Claremont for three seasons from 1942–43 to 1944–45 during the Second World War.
 Joondalup was known as the North Perth Cricket Club before 1999–2000.
 Mount Lawley was known as the Maylands-Mount Lawley Cricket Club between 1924–25 and 1927–28.
 Perth was known as the Metropolitans Cricket Club between 1885–86 and 1898–99, the East Perth Cricket Club between 1899–1900 and 1907–08, and again from 1910–11 to 1953–54, and as the Corinthians Cricket Club 1908–09 to 1909–10.
 South Perth participated in the competition from 1930–31 to 1934–35, in 1941–42 and from 1945–46 onwards.
 Subiaco-Floreat was formed from a merger of the Subiaco and Floreat Park Cricket Clubs in 1977–78. The Subiaco Cricket Club was founded in 1907–08 as the Subiaco-Leederville Cricket Club, changing its name to Subiaco in 1942–43. The Floreat Park was founded in 1957–58, but only played 2nd Grade cricket.
 The West Perth Cricket Club (formed in 1889 as Federal CC and known as West Perth from 1890–91) merged with South Suburban C.A. club Willetton (formed in 1973) in late 1982, effective from the 1983-84 season. The merged entity became known as the Southern Districts Cricket Club from 1983-84 to 1987-88. Willetton's SSCA arm broke away prior to the 1987-88 season and changed their name to the Willetton Senior Cricket Club, whilst Southern Districts became the Willetton District Cricket Club in 1988-89.

Former clubs
Former clubs include Australians, CBC, Central, City Temperance, East Fremantle, Henley Park, High School, I'Zingari, Karrakatta, Maylands, North-East Fremantle, North Fremantle, Perth Boys School, Port, Richmond, South Fremantle, North Perth and Wanderers.

Associated competitions

 Alcohol.Think Again Premier Cricket Competition (First Grade)
 Second Grade
 Third Grade
 Fourth Grade
 Ted Hussey Shield (Under 17)
 Tony Mann Shield - formerly John McGuire Shield (Under 15)
 Graham McKenzie Shield (Under 14)
 John Inverarity Shield (Under 13)
 One Day League (formerly the Sunday League)

 District Premier Twenty20 
 WADCC Statewide Twenty20
 Colts Twenty20 (an Under 21 Knockout Competition)
 Female A Grade
 Female B Grade
 Female Youth

See also

Western Australian Cricket Association
Grade cricket
Cricket in Western Australia

References

Sport in Perth, Western Australia
Grade cricket competitions in Australia
Recurring sporting events established in 1885
1885 establishments in Australia
Sports leagues established in 1885